Geophysical Research Letters is a biweekly peer-reviewed scientific journal of geoscience published by the American Geophysical Union that was established in 1974. The editor-in-chief is Harihar Rajaram.

Aims and scope
The journal aims for rapid publication of concise research reports on one or more of the disciplines covered by the American Geophysical Union, such as atmospheric sciences, solid Earth, space science, oceanography, hydrology, land surface processes, and the cryosphere. The journal also publishes invited reviews that cover advances achieved during the past two or three years. The target readership is the earth science community, the broader scientific community, and the general public.

Abstracting and indexing
This journal is abstracted and indexed in:

According to the 2020 Journal Citation Reports, the journal has a 2019 impact factor of 4.58. Geophysical Research Letters was also the 5th most cited publication on climate change between 1999 and 2009.

See also 
 List of scientific journals in earth and atmospheric sciences

References

External links 
 

Geophysics journals
Publications established in 1974
English-language journals
Biweekly journals
American Geophysical Union academic journals
Wiley (publisher) academic journals